John David "J. D." Souther (born November 2, 1945) is an American singer, songwriter, and actor. He has written and co-written songs recorded by Linda Ronstadt and the Eagles. Souther is probably best known for his songwriting abilities, especially in the field of country rock. He co-wrote some of the biggest hits for the Eagles, including "Best of My Love", "Victim of Love", "Heartache Tonight", and "New Kid in Town". "How Long", which appears on the Eagles' Long Road Out of Eden, was written by Souther and originally recorded on his first solo album in 1972. Souther recorded two major hit songs in his solo career: "You're Only Lonely" (1979) and "Her Town Too" (1981), a duet with longtime friend James Taylor.

Career 
Souther was born in Detroit, Michigan, United States, but raised in Amarillo, Texas. As a musician and songwriter, he was greatly influenced in his formative years by fellow Texan Roy Orbison.

His first recordings were with local group 'The Cinders' who traveled to the nearby Norman Petty Studios in Clovis, New Mexico. Their first 45 rpm record was released on the tiny RIC label in 1965, then Norman Petty successfully shopped their recordings to Warner Brothers for a second single release as 'John David and The Cinders' in 1966. After moving to Los Angeles in the late 1960s, Souther met musician and songwriter Glenn Frey, and eventually the two became roommates and musical collaborators, and for a time performed as a folk duo using the name Longbranch Pennywhistle. Their lone, eponymous album was released in 1970 on Jimmy Bowen's Amos Records.

After recording an eponymous solo studio album in 1972, Souther next teamed up with Chris Hillman and Richie Furay to form the Souther–Hillman–Furay Band. The group released two albums but creative tensions led to the band's demise.

He wrote "Run Like a Thief", which appeared on Home Plate by Bonnie Raitt in 1975.

1976 saw the release of Souther's second solo LP Black Rose, lushly produced by Peter Asher and considered by many to be his finest work.
It features a superlative duet with Linda Ronstadt, "If You Have Crying Eyes".

Souther has contributed as a singer to works written by other artists, including backing vocals with Don Henley; on "The Light Is On" for Christopher Cross on his debut album; on the songs "False Faces" and "Loose Ends" on Dan Fogelberg's 1976 LP Nether Lands; and, with Fogelberg, as the Hot Damn Brothers on Fogelberg's 1975 LP Captured Angel.

He scored his biggest solo hit with the 1979 song "You're Only Lonely" from the album of the same name, which reached number 7 on the Billboard Hot 100 and held the number 1 spot on the Adult Contemporary chart for five consecutive weeks.

The Eagles recording "Heartache Tonight," written by Souther, Bob Seger, Glenn Frey, and Don Henley, was released in 1979 and became the band's final chart-topping song on the Hot 100.

Souther briefly dated Linda Ronstadt and co-produced her Don't Cry Now album, as well as writing songs for several of her multi-platinum albums, including "Faithless Love" from Heart Like a Wheel and "White Rhythm and Blues" on Living in the USA. Souther also recorded several additional duets with Ronstadt including "Prisoner in Disguise," "Sometimes You Can't Win," and "Hearts Against the Wind," which was featured in the 1980 film Urban Cowboy.

A collaboration with his old friend James Taylor called "Her Town Too" (from Taylor's platinum-certified Dad Loves His Work album) reached number 11 on the Hot 100 and number 5 on the AC chart in 1981.

In 1987, he contributed to, performed on, and did the vocal arrangements for the Roy Orbison and Friends: A Black and White Night concert and video. That same year he collaborated with Clannad, providing guest vocals for their album Sirius. He sang the Platters' "Smoke Gets in Your Eyes" in Steven Spielberg's 1989 film Always, and wrote the theme song to the 1989-1992 sitcom Anything But Love.

The Don Henley hit song "The Heart of the Matter" (1989) was also co-written by Souther.

On October 14, 2008, Souther released If the World Was You, his first new studio release in nearly 25 years. In the fall of 2009, he released a follow up live album titled Rain - Live at the Belcourt Theatre, featuring a blend of old and new material.

On May 31, 2011, Souther released Natural History, featuring new versions of his songs recorded by other artists.

On October 9, 2012, he released Midnight in Tokyo, an EP that was recorded live.

On June 14, 2013, Souther was inducted into the Songwriters Hall of Fame and called "a principal architect of the Southern California sound and a major influence on a generation of songwriters."

He wrote the song "Wishing on Another Lucky Star", featured on the soundtrack of the movie Permanent Record.

Souther co-wrote "Doin' Time for Bein' Young", a song performed by James Intveld for the soundtrack of the 1990 Johnny Depp movie Cry-Baby.

Actor 
Souther played the character of John Dunaway in the (1989–1990) third season of the television drama Thirtysomething and Ted in the film Postcards from the Edge (1990).

He appeared in the audiobook of Jimmy Buffett's A Salty Piece of Land. Souther played Jesse James in the television movie Purgatory in 1999 and Jeffrey Pommeroy in My Girl 2. Souther also appeared in the 2012 mystery thriller Deadline.

He had a recurring role in the first season of country music drama series Nashville, which premiered in October 2012 and he reprised his role in a 2017 episode of the fifth season.

Personal life 
Souther married Alexandra Sliwin, a member of the group Honey Ltd., in March 1969; they divorced in 1972. He dated Linda Ronstadt and Stevie Nicks in the 1970s. Judee Sill's song "Jesus Was a Crossmaker" was written for Souther, who she said broke her heart after a short affair. In December 2002, Souther moved from the Hollywood Hills to Nashville, Tennessee. In 2004, he married Sarah Nicholson from Bansha, Ireland; they divorced in 2010.

Discography

Albums

Singles

References

External links 
 
 
 

1945 births
American male actors
American country singer-songwriters
American rock musicians
American rock singers
American rock songwriters
Columbia Records artists
Country musicians from Michigan
Elektra Records artists
Living people
Singers from Detroit
Souther–Hillman–Furay Band members
Tascosa High School alumni
Warner Records artists
Singer-songwriters from Michigan